This is a list of battalions of the King's Regiment (Liverpool), which existed as an infantry regiment of the British Army from 1881 to 1958.

Original composition
When the 8th (The King's) Regiment of Foot became The King's (Liverpool Regiment) in 1881 under the Cardwell-Childers reforms of the British Armed Forces, eight pre-existent militia and volunteer battalions of Lancashire and the Isle of Man were integrated into the structure of the King's Regiment. Volunteer battalions had been created in reaction to a perceived threat of invasion by France in the late 1850s. Organised as "rifle volunteer corps", they were independent of the British Army and composed primarily of the middle class. The only change to the regiment's structure during the period of 1881-1908 occurred during the Second Boer War. During the conflict, the regiment formed two additional regular battalions in Ireland in 1900, which required the militia to be renumbered the 5th and 6th battalions to accommodate them. The new battalions disbanded in 1901 and the militia reverted to their original designations.

Reorganisation

The Territorial Force (later Territorial Army) was formed in 1908, which the volunteer battalions joined, while the militia battalions transferred to the "Special Reserve". All volunteer battalions were renumbered to create a single sequential order. Uniquely, the 7th (Isle of Man) Battalion did not join the Territorial Force, instead remaining a "volunteer" battalion.

First World War

The King's Regiment fielded 49 battalions and lost 13,795 officers and other ranks during the course of the war. The regiment's territorial components formed duplicate second and third line battalions. As an example, the three-line battalions of the 5th King's were numbered as the 1/5th, 2/5th, and 3/5th respectively. Many battalions of the King's were formed as part of Secretary of State for War Lord Kitchener's appeal for an initial 100,000 men volunteers in 1914. They were referred to as the New Army or Kitchener's Army. The 17th to 20th King's, New Army "Service" battalions, were referred to as the Liverpool "Pals" because they were predominantly composed of work colleagues. The Volunteer Training Corps were raised with overage or reserved occupation men early in the war, and were initially self-organised into many small corps, with a wide variety of names. Recognition of the corps by the authorities brought regulation and as the war continued the small corps were formed into battalion sized units of the county Volunteer Regiment. In 1918 these were linked to county regiments.

Inter-War
By 1922, all of the regiment's war-raised battalions had disbanded. The King's Regiment did not, however, return to its original peacetime size; it lost the 8th (Liverpool Irish) and 9th battalions shortly after the war ended. The Special Reserve reverted to its militia designation in 1921, then to the Supplementary Reserve in 1924; however, its battalions were effectively placed in 'suspended animation'. As World War II approached, the Territorial Army was reorganised in the mid-1930s, many of its infantry battalions were converted to other roles, especially anti-aircraft.

Second World War
The King's expansion during the Second World War was modest compared to 1914-1918. Existing battalions formed duplicates as in the First World War, while National Defence Companies were combined to create a new "Home Defence" battalion. In addition to this, 16 battalions of the Home Guard were affiliated to the regiment. These wore the 'WL' designation for West Lancashire, the remaining 7 wearing this patch were cap-badged to another regiment. By 1944 one anti-aircraft battery and three rocket batteries (Z Battery) were also part of the regiment, making up most of the 24th Anti-Aircraft Regiment (Home Guard).Due to the daytime (or shift working) occupations of the men the batteries required eight times the manpower of an equivalent regular unit.

Post-World War II

In the immediate post-war period, the army was significantly reduced: nearly all infantry regiments had their first and second battalions amalgamated and the Supplementary Reserve disbanded. A defence review by Duncan Sandys in 1957 decided that the King's would be amalgamated with the Manchester Regiment, to form the King's Regiment (Manchester and Liverpool). They united as the 1st Battalion on 1 September 1958.

Notes

References
 Frederick, John Bassett Moore (1969), Lineage book of the British Army; Mounted Corps and Infantry, 1660-1968, Hope Farm Press
 J.B.M. Frederick, Lineage Book of British Land Forces 1660–1978, New Edition, Vol I, Wakefield: Microform Academic, 1984, .
 
 Brig E.A. James, British Regiments 1914–18, Samson Books 1978/Uckfield: Naval & Military Press, 2001, .
 
 
 Ray Westlake, Tracing the Rifle Volunteers, Barnsley: Pen and Sword, 2010, .

External sources
King's at The Long, Long Trail. Accessed 29 January 2021
Regiments.org. Archive site accessed 17 November 2005
The Regimental Warpath (1914-1918). Archive site accessed 17 November 2005

 
King's Regiment (Liverpool), List of battalions
King's Regiment (Liverpool)
King's Regiment (Liverpool)
Battalions